Emil Fey (23 March 1886 – 16 March 1938) was an officer in the Austro-Hungarian Army, leader of the right-wing paramilitary Heimwehr forces and politician of the First Austrian Republic. He served as Vice-Chancellor of Austria from 1933 to 1934, leading the country into the period of Austrofascism under Chancellor Engelbert Dollfuß. Fey played a vital role in the violent suppression of the Republikanischer Schutzbund and the Social Democratic Workers' Party during the 1934 Austrian Civil War.

Life 
A career officer since 1908, Fey in the rank of a major fought with the Common Army in World War I and was awarded the Military Order of Maria Theresa in 1916. After the war, he joined the Carinthian paramilitary Heimwehr forces against the Yugoslavian troops. In 1927 he founded a local Heimwehr branch in Vienna and became a member of the conservative Christian Social Party. As his political career proceeded, he increasingly rivalled with Heimwehr leader Ernst Rüdiger Starhemberg; both commanders backed the rise of Chancellor Dollfuß and his successor Kurt Schuschnigg, only to be largely disempowered after the implementation of the authoritarian Federal State of Austria (Ständestaat).

On 17 October 1932 Fey joined Dollfuß' cabinet in the rank of a state secretary concerned with public security. He immediately had all conventions of the Social Democrats, the Communists and the Austrian Nazis banned. After the chancellor had suspended the sessions of the National Council, Fey on 15 March 1933 concentrated Heimwehr forces to occupy the Austrian Parliament Building, however, any operation was aborted by the Vienna police. During a parade in May 1933, Major Fey reportedly "knocked three Nazis unconscious with his own ochsenknüttel" (square-edged bludgeon) and promoted Austrian nationalism.

Chancellor Dollfuß made him his deputy on 21 September 1933. Fey continued the persecution of Republikanischer Schutzbund members; the arrest of several Social Democratic politicians on 12 February 1934 sparked the Austrian Civil War. Dollfuß mistrusted Fey's capabilities and on 1 May he lost his office of Vice-Chancellor to his bitter rival Starhemberg. During the July Putsch and Dollfuß' assassination he stayed in the background, later accusations of collaboration with the Nazis have never been conclusively established. He once again joined the Schuschnigg cabinet as Minister for Interior until his final disempowerment in 1935, shunt off to the Donaudampfschiffahrtsgesellschaft.

Upon the Anschluss annexation of Austria by Nazi Germany, Fey was interrogated by Gestapo agents on 15 March 1938. Harassed, he returned home, summoned his 46-year-old wife Malvine and his son Herbert, and wrote an appeal for help to the former Vice-Chancellor Edmund Glaise-Horstenau. Without awaiting the answer, he shot his family and himself in the early morning of the following day.

Notes

References 
This article includes information translated from the German-language Wikipedia article :de:Emil Fey.
Isabella Ackerl und Friedrich Weissensteiner: Österreichisches Personenlexikon der Ersten und Zweiten Republik. Ueberreuter, Wien 1992, S. 108f., 
Attilio Renato Bleibtreu: Unser (Emil) Fey. Ein Bild des Helden. Jung-Österreich, Wien 1934
Georg J. E. Mautner Markhof: Major Emil Fey. Heimwehrführer zwischen Bürgerkrieg, Dollfuß-Mord und Anschluss. Stocker, Graz u. a. 2004,

External links 
 

1886 births
1938 suicides
Politicians from Vienna
Vice-Chancellors of Austria
Deaths by firearm in Austria
Murder–suicides in Europe
Suicides by firearm in Austria
Austrian Roman Catholics
Politicians of Catholic political parties
Military personnel from Vienna
Austrian anti-communists
Austrofascists
Knights Cross of the Military Order of Maria Theresa